The Colonial Medal was a medal of the German Empire established on 13 June 1912 by Kaiser Wilhelm II. The medal and clasps were awarded retroactively for participation in military operations in the German colonies. Exceptions were participants in the Boxer Rebellion 1899-1901, and German South-West Africa in the years 1904-08. These operations were eligible for their own unique commemorative medal.

Description
The medal is made of bronze the obverse of which depicts the right-facing bust of Wilhelm II in uniform, with the initials W II. The reverse has oak leaves on the right and a laurel branch on the left. In the center is the imperial crown which sits above the inscription  ("The brave warriors for Germany's honor"). The ribbon is white with four thin red lines in the center and black stripes on the edges.

Clasps
The medal was awarded with claps which were manufactured of gold plated brass. Clasps were mounted on the ribbon of the medal.

References

Sources
André Hüsken: Katalog der Orden, Ehrenzeichen und Auszeichnungen des Kurfürstentums Brandenburg, der Markgrafschaften Brandenburg-Ansbach und Brandenburg-Bayreuth, des Königreiches Preußen, der Republik Preußen unter Berücksichtigung des Deutschen Reiches, Band 3, Hamburg 2001, 

Orders, decorations, and medals of the German Empire
1912 establishments in Germany
Awards established in 1912
German campaign medals